Robert William Ludovic Lindsay  (18 August 1905 – 6 September 2000) was an English-born Australian politician. From Norwich, England, was educated at Eton College and then Royal Military College, Sandhurst.

An officer of the British Grenadier Guards, he spoke fluent Arabic, and was seconded to the Transjordan Frontier Force in 1930, serving in the Middle East for about four years. He retired from the military in 1937, with the rank of captain. Recalled to service during World War II, he served with the Grenadier Guards in Europe and the Middle East, attaining the rank of brevet major.  

His mother was Australian and he migrated following the war. In 1954, was elected to the Australian House of Representatives as the Liberal member for the Flinders, defeating Labor's Keith Ewert. He held the seat until his retirement in 1966.

Lindsay was made a member of the Order of the British Empire in 1971. He died in 2000.

References

1905 births
2000 deaths
Liberal Party of Australia members of the Parliament of Australia
Members of the Australian House of Representatives for Flinders
Members of the Australian House of Representatives
People educated at Eton College
20th-century Australian politicians
Australian Officers of the Order of the British Empire
English emigrants to Australia
Military personnel from Norfolk
People from Norwich
Grenadier Guards officers
British military personnel of World War II
English people of Australian descent
Transjordan Frontier Force officers